Rugby Manitoba is the provincial administrative body for rugby union in Manitoba, Canada.

References

External links
 Rugby Manitoba

Sports governing bodies of Manitoba
Man